The 1991 NASCAR Busch Series began February 16 and ended on October 27. Bobby Labonte of Labonte Motorsports won the championship.

Races

Goody's 300 

The Goody's 300 was held February 16 at Daytona International Speedway. David Green won the pole.

Top ten results

3-Dale Earnhardt
30-Michael Waltrip
28-Davey Allison
15-Ken Schrader
7-Harry Gant
96-Tom Peck
97-Morgan Shepherd
45-Jimmy Spencer
16-Randy MacDonald
36-Kenny Wallace

Pontiac 200 

The Pontiac 200 was held February 23 at Richmond International Raceway. Jeff Burton won the pole.

Top ten results

7-Harry Gant
3-Dale Earnhardt
15-Kenny Wallace
32-Dale Jarrett
30-Michael Waltrip
97-Morgan Shepherd
44-Bobby Labonte
25-Jimmy Hensley
87-Jimmy Spencer
28-Davey Allison

Goodwrench 200 

The Goodwrench 200 was held March 2 at North Carolina Speedway. Dale Earnhardt won the pole.

Top ten results

32-Dale Jarrett
36-Kenny Wallace
3-Dale Earnhardt
34-Todd Bodine
7-Harry Gant
44-Bobby Labonte
5-Ed Berrier
99-Jeff Burton
59-Robert Pressley
25-Jimmy Hensley

Miller Classic 

The Miller Classic was held March 10 at Martinsville Speedway. Elton Sawyer won the pole.

Top ten results

25-Jimmy Hensley
32-Dale Jarrett
36-Kenny Wallace
44-Bobby Labonte
27-Elton Sawyer
31-Steve Grissom
63-Chuck Bown
6-Tommy Houston
75-Ward Burton
19-Cecil Eunice

Spring 200 

The Spring 200 was held March 24 at Volusia County Speedway. Chuck Bown won the pole.

Top ten results

36-Kenny Wallace
6-Tommy Houston
52-Butch Miller
25-Jimmy Hensley
8-David Green
86-Jeff Green
44-Bobby Labonte
34-Todd Bodine
31-Steve Grissom
63-Chuck Bown

Mountain Dew 400 

The Mountain Dew 400 was held March 31 at Hickory Motor Speedway. Jimmy Hensley won the pole.

Top ten results

52-Butch Miller
25-Jimmy Hensley
87-Joe Nemechek
15-Ken Schrader
49-Ed Ferree
59-Robert Pressley
44-Bobby Labonte
34-Todd Bodine
08-Bobby Dotter
96-Tom Peck

Pontiac 200 

The Pontiac 200 was held April 6 at Darlington Raceway. Jimmy Hensley won the pole.

Top ten results

32-Dale Jarrett
44-Bobby Labonte
3-Dale Earnhardt
29-Phil Parsons
34-Todd Bodine
25-Jimmy Hensley
87-Joe Nemechek
99-Jeff Burton
1-Jeff Gordon
96-Tom Peck

Budweiser 250 

The Budweiser 250 was held April 13 at Bristol Motor Speedway. Jeff Burton won the pole.

Top ten results

44-Bobby Labonte
8-David Green
3-Dale Earnhardt
45-Jimmy Spencer
33-Ed Berrier
23-Clifford Allison
7-Harry Gant
72-Tracy Leslie
36-Kenny Wallace
63-Chuck Bown

Nestle 200 

The Nestle 200 was held April 27 at Lanier Raceway. Robert Pressley won the pole.

Top ten results

8-David Green
1-Jeff Gordon
18-Mike Wallace
59-Robert Pressley
63-Chuck Bown
6-Tommy Houston
99-Jeff Burton
34-Todd Bodine
56-Dave Mader III
75-Ward Burton

Carquest 300 

The Carquest 300 was held May 4 at South Boston Speedway. Steve Grissom won the pole. On Lap 201, former track champion at Hickory Motor Speedway and New Asheville Speedway Gary Neice suffered a heart attack and crashed into the wall in Turn 3, perishing in the incident.

Top ten results

99-Jeff Burton
87-Joe Nemechek
33-Ed Berrier
08-Bobby Dotter
31-Steve Grissom
44-Bobby Labonte
27-Elton Sawyer
96-Tom Peck
79-Dave Rezendes
34-Todd Bodine

Pontiac Pacesetters 200 

The Pontiac Pacesetters 200 was held May 11 at Pennsylvania International Raceway. Jimmy Hensley won the pole.  Races in the Northeastern United States were declared combination Busch Series / Busch North Series races;  drivers in both series participated in one race for points in both series.

Top ten results

63-Chuck Bown
31-Steve Grissom
36-Kenny Wallace
8-David Green
1-Jeff Gordon
18-Mike Wallace
44-Bobby Labonte
6-Tommy Houston
25-Jimmy Hensley
59-Robert Pressley

Champion 300 

The Champion 300 was held May 25 at Charlotte Motor Speedway. Jack Sprague won the pole.

Top ten results

3-Dale Earnhardt
92-Dick Trickle
7-Harry Gant
25-Jimmy Hensley
48-Jack Sprague
17-Darrell Waltrip
6-Tommy Houston
44-Bobby Labonte
75-Ward Burton
94-Terry Labonte

Budweiser 200 

The Budweiser 200 was held June 1 at Dover International Speedway. Dave Mader III won the pole.

Top ten results

34-Todd Bodine*
1-Jeff Gordon
17-Darrell Waltrip
75-Ward Burton
44-Bobby Labonte
28-Davey Allison
25-Jimmy Hensley
31-Steve Grissom
96-Tom Peck
87-Joe Nemechek
This was Bodine's first career Busch Grand National victory.

Roses Stores 300 

The Roses Stores 300 was held June 8 at Orange County Speedway. Jeff Gordon won the pole.

Top ten results

59-Robert Pressley
25-Jimmy Hensley
8-David Green
36-Kenny Wallace
99-Jeff Burton
44-Bobby Labonte
6-Tommy Houston
96-Tom Peck
1-Jeff Gordon
49-Ed Ferree

Granger Select 400 

The Granger Select 400 was held June 15 at Hickory Motor Speedway. Chuck Bown won the pole.

Top ten results

25-Jimmy Hensley
1-Jeff Gordon
44-Bobby Labonte
33-Ed Berrier
31-Steve Grissom
59-Robert Pressley
96-Tom Peck
72-Tracy Leslie
08-Bobby Dotter
87-Joe Nemechek

Carolina Pride/Budweiser 250 

The Carolina Pride/Budweiser 250 was held June 22 at Myrtle Beach Speedway. Chuck Bown won the pole.

Top ten results

63-Chuck Bown
59-Robert Pressley
31-Steve Grissom
36-Kenny Wallace
87-Joe Nemechek
34-Todd Bodine
96-Tom Peck
75-Ward Burton
8-David Green
33-Ed Berrier

Fay's 150 

The inaugural Fay's 150 was held June 29 at Watkins Glen International Raceway. Terry Labonte won the pole. Races in the Northeastern United States were declared combination Busch Series / Busch North Series races;  drivers in both series participated in one race for points in both series.

Top ten results

94-Terry Labonte
87-Joe Nemechek
4-Ernie Irvan
99-Jeff Burton
34-Todd Bodine
1-Jeff Gordon
63-Chuck Bown
75-Curtis Markham
31-Steve Grissom
8-David Green

True Value 250 

The True Value 250 was held July 7 at Oxford Plains Speedway. Billy Clark won the pole.
Races in the Northeastern United States were declared combination Busch Series / Busch North Series races;  drivers in both series participated in one race for points in both series.

Top ten results

28-Ricky Craven
6-Tommy Houston
34-Todd Bodine
72-Tracy Leslie
08-Bobby Dotter
99-Jeff Burton
44-Bobby Labonte
36-Kenny Wallace
31-Steve Grissom
87-Joe Nemechek

NOTE: Under NASCAR rules at the time, some Busch Series cars carried different numbers than usual; in combination Busch / Busch North races, if two cars carried the same number, the faster qualified car earned the right to the number. Some Busch Series cars carried different numbers, and Busch North Series cars, because of the numbering rule. (Ricky Craven and Jimmy Hensley both had #25, in the Busch North and Busch, respectively; Hensley was the quicker car, and ran the #25; Craven ran the #28.)

Budweiser 300 

The Budweiser 300 was held July 14 at New Hampshire International Speedway. Jimmy Hensley won the pole.

Top ten results

36-Kenny Wallace
63-Chuck Bown
31-Steve Grissom
30-Michael Waltrip
10-Ernie Irvan
87-Joe Nemechek
59-Robert Pressley
8-David Green
0-Dick McCabe
16-Stub Fadden

Coors Light 300 

The Coors Light 300 was held July 20 at South Boston Speedway. Todd Bodine won the pole.

Top ten results

31-Steve Grissom
36-Kenny Wallace
6-Tommy Houston
96-Tom Peck
11-Jack Ingram
34-Todd Bodine
67-Elton Sawyer
5-Jay Fogleman
25-Jimmy Hensley
75-Butch Miller

Granger Select 200 

The Granger Select 200 was held July 27 at New River Valley Speedway. Todd Bodine won the pole.

Top ten results

63-Chuck Bown
36-Kenny Wallace
59-Robert Pressley
8-David Green
6-Tommy Houston
31-Steve Grissom
25-Jimmy Hensley
87-Joe Nemechek
96-Tom Peck
75-Butch Miller

Kroger 200 

The Kroger 200 was held August 3 at Indianapolis Raceway Park. Ward Burton won the pole.

Top ten results

44-Bobby Labonte
72-Tracy Leslie
92-Dick Trickle
63-Chuck Bown
6-Tommy Houston
97-Joe Nemechek
32-Dale Jarrett
33-Ed Berrier
11-Jack Ingram*
9-Troy Beebe

Failed to qualify: Mike Oliver (#28), John Linville (#62)
This was Ingram's last career start.

Texas Pete 300 

The Texas Pete 300 was held August 10 at Orange County Speedway. Kenny Wallace won the pole.

Top ten results

25-Jimmy Hensley
59-Robert Pressley
75-Butch Miller
31-Steve Grissom
63-Chuck Bown
87-Joe Nemechek
36-Kenny Wallace
5-Jay Fogleman
44-Bobby Labonte
72-Tracy Leslie

Jay Johnson 250 

The Jay Johnson 250 was held August 23 at Bristol Motor Speedway. Chuck Bown won the pole.

Top ten results

32-Dale Jarrett
44-Bobby Labonte
1-Jeff Gordon
28-Davey Allison
25-Jimmy Hensley
36-Kenny Wallace
59-Robert Pressley
63-Chuck Bown
99-Jeff Burton
75-Butch Miller

Gatorade 200 

The Gatorade 200 was held August 31 at Darlington Raceway. Harry Gant won the pole.

Top ten results

3-Dale Earnhardt
30-Michael Waltrip
34-Todd Bodine
18-Dick Trickle
44-Bobby Labonte
17-Darrell Waltrip
7-Harry Gant
96-Tom Peck
79-Dave Rezendes
15-Ken Schrader

Autolite 200 

The Autolite 200 was held September 6 at Richmond International Raceway. Bobby Labonte won the pole.

Top ten results

7-Harry Gant
59-Robert Pressley
32-Dale Jarrett
30-Michael Waltrip
97-Morgan Shepherd
17-Darrell Waltrip
3-Dale Earnhardt
87-Joe Nemechek
27-Ward Burton
4-Ernie Irvan

SplitFire 200 

The SplitFire 200 was held September 14 at Dover Downs International Speedway. Butch Miller won the pole.

Top ten results

7-Harry Gant
59-Robert Pressley
27-Ward Burton
18-Dick Trickle
17-Ken Schrader
87-Joe Nemechek
12-Tommy Ellis
1-Jeff Gordon
96-Tom Peck
6-Tommy Houston

All Pro 300 

The All Pro 300 was held October 5 at Charlotte Motor Speedway. Ward Burton won the pole.

Top ten results

7-Harry Gant
15-Ken Schrader
25-Jimmy Hensley
12-Tommy Ellis
96-Tom Peck
17-Darrell Waltrip
36-Kenny Wallace
34-Todd Bodine
29-Phil Parsons
84-Bill Elliott

NE Chevy 250 

The NE Chevy 250 was held October 13 at New Hampshire International Speedway. Ricky Craven won the pole. Races in the Northeastern United States were declared combination Busch Series / Busch North Series races;  drivers in both series participated in one race for points in both series.

Top ten results

25-Ricky Craven
63-Chuck Bown
7-Harry Gant
44-Bobby Labonte
59-Robert Pressley
75-Butch Miller
99-Jeff Burton
41-Jamie Aube
47-Kelly Moore
0-Dick McCabe

NOTE: Under NASCAR rules at the time, some Busch Series cars carried different numbers than usual; in combination Busch / Busch North races, if two cars carried the same number, the faster qualified car earned the right to the number.  Some Busch Series cars carried different numbers, and Busch North Series cars, because of the numbering rule. (Ricky Craven and Jimmy Hensley both had #25, in the Busch North and Busch, respectively; Hensley had to run #5 because #25 was given to Craven.)

AC-Delco 200 

The AC-Delco 200 was held October 19 at North Carolina Speedway. Ernie Irvan won the pole.

Top ten results

10-Ernie Irvan
32-Dale Jarrett
36-Kenny Wallace
87-Joe Nemechek
7-Harry Gant
3-Dale Earnhardt
59-Robert Pressley
44-Bobby Labonte
84-Bill Elliott
34-Todd Bodine

Winston Classic 

The Winston Classic was held October 27 at Martinsville Speedway. Bobby Labonte won the pole.

Top ten results

7-Harry Gant
63-Chuck Bown
32-Dale Jarrett
34-Todd Bodine
44-Bobby Labonte
27-Ward Burton
99-Jeff Burton
1-Jeff Gordon
79-Dave Rezendes
25-Jimmy Hensley

Final points standings 

Bobby Labonte - 4264
Kenny Wallace - 4190
Robert Pressley - 3929
Chuck Bown - 3922
Jimmy Hensley - 3916
Joe Nemechek - 3902
Todd Bodine - 3825
Tommy Houston - 3777
Tom Peck - 3746
Steve Grissom - 3689
Jeff Gordon - 3582
Jeff Burton - 3533
David Green - 3389
Bobby Dotter - 3327
Tracy Leslie - 3326
Butch Miller - 3255 
Dave Rezendes - 3172
Ward Burton - 3145
Ed Berrier - 3067
Elton Sawyer - 2481
Harry Gant - 2309
Troy Beebe - 2274
Jay Elcon - 2208
Dale Jarrett - 2172
Cecil Eunice - 2097
Richard Lasater - 1989
Ed Ferree - 1837
Dale Earnhardt - 1799
Ernie Irvan - 1551
Jeff Green - 1396
Darrell Waltrip -  1305
Davey Allison - 1303
Morgan Shepherd - 1298
Tommy Ellis - 1253
Michael Waltrip - 1246
Ken Schrader - 1180
Jack Ingram - 1080
Dick Trickle - 1050
Mike Oliver - 1000
Mike Wallace - 907
Ricky Craven - 782
Jim Bown - 743
Jimmy Spencer - 636
Jack Sprague - 629
Joe Bessey - 623
Mike McLaughlin - 620
Phil Parsons - 605
Jamie Aube - 573
Terry Labonte - 560
Jay Fogleman - 538
Patty Moise - 494

Full Drivers' Championship

(key) Bold – Pole position awarded by time. Italics – Pole position set by owner's points. * – Most laps led.

Rookie of the Year 
20-year-old Jeff Gordon, driving for the newly formed Bill Davis Racing, won Rookie of the Year honors in 1991, starting 30 of 31 races and finishing in the top-five five times. The top runner-up was David Green, who was released from his FILMAR Racing ride at season's end. Tracy Leslie, Troy Beebe, Cecil Eunice and Richard Lasater were the only other drivers to attempt a full schedule.

See also
1991 NASCAR Winston Cup Series

External links 
Busch Series standings and statistics for 1991

NASCAR Xfinity Series seasons